The Gentleman from America is a 1923 American silent comedy film directed by Edward Sedgwick and featuring Hoot Gibson and Louise Lorraine. It also featured a young Boris Karloff in an uncredited bit part. The screenplay was written by George C. Hull, based on a story by Raymond L. Schrock. The film's tagline was "This might be called the story of a fighting American in sunny Spain - with flashing senoritas and romance in the background! It's something new for Hoot Gibson - but you'll like it, and so will your patrons!"  It is considered a lost film.

Plot
Two pals in the American Expeditionary Forces in France during World War I, Dennis O'Shane (Hoot Gibson) and Johnny Day (Tom O'Brien), are given a furlough. With a borrowed dollar, they clean up in a craps game and head for Paris. They board the wrong train and land in Cardonia, a principality of Spain. Dennis is mistaken for a desperate bandito and, at the same time, falls in love with Carmen Navarro (Louise Lorraine), the prettiest senorita in Cardonia.

In a series of adventures, Dennis saves her from marriage to a villain, learns she is the daughter of the Grand Duke (Albert Prisco), and becomes the assistant ruler of the kingdom. In his excitement, he forgets that he is a member of the American A.E.F. until a couple of husky M.P.s arrive on scene to cart him off to a military prison. He leaves his bride with the excuse that General Pershing has called him back to take charge of the Army, but he will return as soon as he gets the country's affairs in such shape that he can turn them over to an assistant.

Cast
 Hoot Gibson as Dennis O'Shane (credited as Ed "Hoot" Gibson)
 Tom O'Brien as Johnny Day
 Louise Lorraine as Carmen Navarro
 Carmen Phillips as The Vamp
 Frank Leigh as Don Ramón Gonzales
 Jack Crane as Juan Gonzales
 Robert McKenzie as San Felipe (credited as Bob McKenzie)
 Albert Prisco as Grand Duke
 Rosa Rosanova as Old Inez
 Ricardo Cortez as Bit Role (uncredited)
 Sidney De Gray as Bit Role (uncredited)
 Boris Karloff as Bit Role (uncredited)
 Burton Law as Bit Role (uncredited)
 Karl Silvera as Bit Role (uncredited)

See also
 Hoot Gibson filmography
 Boris Karloff filmography

References

External links

1923 films
1923 comedy films
American silent feature films
American black-and-white films
Universal Pictures films
Films directed by Edward Sedgwick
Silent American comedy films
1920s American films